Ruthenian Church may refer to:

 Ruthenian Catholic Church (historical), that existed from the 15th to the 18th century 
 Ruthenian Byzantine Catholic Church, one of the 23 particular (sui iuris) Eastern Catholic Churches
 a church building that is fashioned in accordance with the liturgical Ruthenian Rite

See also
 Ruthenian (disambiguation)
 Ruthenia (disambiguation)